The International Violin Competition Henri Marteau is a violin competition named after the famous violinist and violin teacher Henri Marteau. It is open to violinists of all nationalities aged under 25 and takes place every three years at Haus Marteau in Lichtenberg, Bavaria and at Freiheitshalle in Hof, Bavaria, Germany.

The 7th International Violin Competition Henri Marteau, scheduled from April 26 to May 9, 2020, was cancelled due to COVID-19 pandemic. The next competition is planned for 2023.

Foundation, sponsorship and cooperation
The 125th birthday of the German-French violinist and composer Henri Marteau in 1999 inspired "Freundeskreis Haus Marteau e.V." to initiate the competition and to hold it in 2002 and 2005. In 2007, the District of Upper Franconia under its president Günther Denzler took over the sponsorship. Since then, the artistic and general coordination has been conferred to the orchestra Hofer Symphoniker. The competition became a member of the World Federation of International Music Competitions in 2012.

Idea and promotion
The goals of the competition are to encourage highly skilled young violinists aged under 25 on their way to an international career and to underline the importance of musical education for young people, and to enable the exchange between young talented musicians and renowned violinists and violin professors. The competition tries also to make the name and work of Henri Marteau better known.

The competition promotes young musicians by providing cash and non-cash awards and by providing a subsequent support program which includes scholarships, the procurement of concerts and a broadcast production with Bayerischer Rundfunk which is the media partner of the competition and an ideal platform for the performances of the young musicians through an intense media coverage.

Commissioned works
Since 2011, the competition commissions works as required pieces for the participants. So far, the following compositions were created:
 for 2011: Fazıl Say, Cleopatra, Op. 34 for solo violin
 for 2014: Steven Mackey, Repeated Notes for solo violin
 for 2017: Søren Nils Eichberg, Improvisation über einen Gedanken aus dem Violinkonzert von Henri Marteau for solo violin 
 for 2020: Xiaogang Ye, Golden Hydrangea for solo violin

Admission: impartial jury
Among discussions about 'rigged' or unfair competitions, the International Violin Competition Henri Marteau has decided in 2017 to exclude current or former students of the jury members from participation: Students of the jury members are not eligible to participate. A student is someone who either received tuition from a jury member between October 2019 and April 2020 and/or prior to the competition for a period exceeding six months. Violinists who participate in a master class held by a jury member between January 2020 and April 2020 are not eligible to participate in the competition either.

Jury
Chairman of the jury and artistic advisor of the competition is the conductor Gilbert Varga, son of the famous Hungarian violinist Tibor Varga and from 1980 to 1985 chief conductor of Hofer Symphoniker. In 2020, these jury members were engaged:

 Gilbert Varga, Hungary/Switzerland/UK, chairman
 Benjamin Beilman, USA
 Michael Frischenschlager, Austria
 Erika Geldsetzer, Germany
 Ilya Kaler, Russia/USA
 Nam Yun Kim, South Korea
 Natalia Lomeiko, Russia/UK/New Zealand
 Silvia Marcovici, Romania/France
 Kurt Sassmannshaus, Germany/USA
 Ingolf Turban, Germany

Procedure
The International Violin Competition Henri Marteau opens with an opening concert performed by laureates of the former competitions at Haus Marteau in Lichtenberg.

The competition is split into three rounds. The participants play works for violin, soloistic, with piano accompaniment and in the final accompanied by orchestra. The first round and the semifinal take place at Haus Marteau in Lichtenberg. In the final, candidates play a great violin concerto together with the symphony orchestra Hofer Symphoniker at Freiheitshalle in Hof.

The competition closes with a celebratory gala concert of the laureates and Hofer Symphoniker at Freiheitshalle Hof.

Prizes
The prizes to be awarded have a total amount of €35,000 (~US$40,000): 1st prize €10,000, 2nd prize €7,500, 3rd prize €5,000. Additionally, there are numerous special prizes, also supplied with money (each €1,000), scholarships for master classes, the loan of a copy of the famous Maggini violin of Henri Marteau for three years, and a broadcast production with Bayerischer Rundfunk followed by a CD release.

Laureates
The first laureates of the former competitions were:

2017
1st prize: Lorenz Chen, Germany
2nd prize: Yukino Nakamura, Japan
3rd prize: Stepan Starikov, Russia

2014
1st prize: Fedor Rudin, France/Russia
2nd prize: Misako Akama, Japan
3rd prize: Minkyum Kim, South Korea

2011
1st prize: Tobias Feldmann, Germany
2nd prize: Edouard Mätzener, Switzerland
3rd prize: Ji Young Lim, South Korea

2008
1st prize: Andrei Baranov, Russia
2nd prize: Alexandra Conunova-Dumortier, Moldavia
3rd prize: Byol Kang, Germany

2005
Category A (born after December 31, 1987)
1st prize: Danae Papamatthäou-Matschke, Greece
2nd prize: Paula Sumane, Latvia
3rd prize: Sarah Christian, Germany
4th prize: Nizan Bartana, Israel

Category B (born between January 1, 1980 and December 31, 1987)
1st prize: Stefan Tarara, Germany
2nd prize: Rebekka Hartmann, Germany
3rd prize: Sang-Mee Huh, South Korea
4th prize: Zsolt-Tihamer Visontay, Hungary

2002
Category A (born after December 31, 1984)
1st prize: Yuki Manuela Janke, Germany/Japan
2nd prize: Jung Yoon Yang, South Korea
3rd prize: Adam Banda, Hungary

Category B (born between January 1, 1977 and December 31, 1984)
1st prize: Andreas Janke, Germany/Japan
2nd prize: Yoon Shin Song, South Korea
3rd prize: Lucja Madziar, Poland

Honorary Committee
 Christoph Adt, president of Hochschule für Musik Nürnberg, artistic advisor of Internationale Musikbegegnungsstätte Haus Marteau
 Ulrike Brett-Einsiedel, chairwoman of Freundeskreis Haus Marteau e.V.
 Thomas Goppel, president of Bayerischer Musikrat
 Heidrun Piwernetz, president of district government of Upper Franconia, chairwoman of board of trustees/Oberfrankenstiftung
 Henry Schramm, president of district parliament of Upper Franconia
 Bernd Sibler, Bavarian state minister for science and arts

External links
 International Violin Competition Henri Marteau official website
 International Violin Competition Henri Marteau official Facebook account
 The competition on the website of the World Federation of International Music Competitions
 Commissioned work 2011: Cleopatra, Op. 34 by Fazıl Say, published by Schott Music
 Commissioned work 2014: Repeated Notes by Steven Mackey, published by Boosey & Hawkes
 Commissioned work 2017: Improvisation über einen Gedanken aus dem Violinkonzert von Henri Marteau by Søren Nils Eichberg, published by Edition Wilhelm Hansen

References 

Violin competitions
Music competitions in Germany
1999 establishments in Germany
Hof, Bavaria